Tomás Leonardo Lecanda (born 29 January 2002) is an Argentine professional footballer who plays as a centre-back for Aldosivi, on loan from River Plate.

Career
Lecanda is product of River Plate's youth academy, having joined in 2011. On 27 September 2019, he signed his first professional contract with his childhood club. Lecanda made his professional debut with River Plate in a 2–1 Copa Libertadores win over Independiente Santa Fe on 19 May 2021; the game was noteworthy as River Plate was hit by a COVID-19 outbreak, resulting in them having no substitute players, and their outfielder Enzo Pérez had to play as goalkeeper.

In January 2022, Lecanda was loaned out to Barracas Central until the end of the year. In June 2022, the spell was terminated and Lecenda instead joined fellow league club Aldosivi on loan for the rest of the year.

International career
Lecanda is a youth international for Argentina. He represented the Argentina U17s in their campaign at the 2019 FIFA U-17 World Cup, and helped them win the 2019 South American U-17 Championship. He was part of the Argentina U18s that won the 2019 Granatkin Memorial, scoring a goal in the final.

References

Honours
Argentina U17
South American U-17 Championship: 2019

Argentina U18
Granatkin Memorial: 2019 Granatkin Memorial

External links
 

2002 births
Living people
People from San Isidro Partido
Argentine footballers
Argentina youth international footballers
Association football defenders
Club Atlético River Plate footballers
Barracas Central players
Aldosivi footballers
Argentine Primera División players
Sportspeople from Buenos Aires Province